The 2009 Indian general election in Haryana, occurred for 10 seats in the state.

List of Elected MPs

Indian general elections in Haryana
2000s in Haryana
Har